Volodymyr Klynovskyi (born 22 March 1969) is a Ukrainian football coach who currently serves as the Club Head Coach for Toronto Fusion FC

Managerial career
On April 17, 2008 Klynovskyi was appointed by North York Astros head coach Rafael Carbajal to serve as his assistant coach for the 2008 season. In his first season, he helped the Astros set an all-time record for most points and wins in a season. But unfortunately during their playoff run the Astros were eliminated by the Serbian White Eagles in the quarterfinal match, with the game ending 2-1 in favor of the White Eagles. The following season he maintained his position as assistant coach, but this time serving under a new head coach Ugur Cimen. On June 29, 2009 Klynovskyi was upgraded to the head coach position when Cimen unexpectedly resigned from his coaching duties and returned to Turkey due to personal reasons. His first match was a  4-1 defeat by Toronto Croatia. Klynovskyi was placed in a difficult position due to the fact the Astros suffered four straight losses under Cimen, and at the same time conceded the most goals in the National Division at the time. Following the defeat to Toronto, Klynovskyi decided to make several new changes to boost up his roster of players in order to complete for a playoff  spot. He released many of the new players signed by Cimen and brought up several players from the Reserve Division. In preparation for his goal Klynovskyi resolved to make new additional signings such as Adrian Pena, Sergio De Luca, Kurt Ramsey, Adrian Mancini and Gersi Xhuti.

After making several new changes to the line-up following the loss to Toronto Croatia, the Astros tied 2-2 against St. Catharines Wolves to achieve their first point of the season. On July 20, 2009 Klynovskyi led the Astros to their first win of the season in 3-2 victory over Trois Rivieres Attak. Unfortunately the Astros would continue to struggle with their goal of reaching the final playoff berth with many inconsistent matches. Klynovskyi was able to lead the Astros to a four-game unbeaten streak which meant that his squad was only three points away of TFC Academy who held the last playoff spot. The Astros next match was in Vaughan against the Italia Shooters where they needed a guaranteed win in order to surpass TFC in the standings. On September 14, 2009 in their decisive match against the Shooters the home side scored early in the 10' minute on a penalty kick; the Astros held in with a goal from Diego Maradona to tie the match, but unfortunately Italia scored a late winner to end the match with a 2-1 victory over the Astros. Thus eliminating the North York side from contention of reaching the post season.

In 2010, Klynovskyi was appointed the Milltown FC Reserve team head coach and assistant coach to head coach Rafael Carbajal. On May 16, 2010 he temporarily stepped in for Head Coach Carbajal, while he was away with the Canada U-20 Coaching Staff. Klynovskyi led Milltown to a scoreless draw with the Montreal Impact Academy in the club's first match in club history.

Statistics

Manager

Coaching Qualification and Experience
Volodymyr Klynovskyi was certified with The Football Association TheFA England, Ukrainian Football Federation FFU, Canadian Soccer Association CSA and Ontario Soccer Association OSA Canada and held a UEFA "PRO" Licence.

Volodymyr Klynovskyi coached Youth and Professional teams, including Milltown F.C., North York Astros S.C., Mississauga S.C., Erin Mills S.C., Islington Rangers S.C., AC Milan Academy, Golden Feet Academy, Peel Halton District Football Association, Ontario Soccer Association.

Personal life
Volodymyr Klynovskyi has a University background in Mechanical Engineering and Applied Petroleum Chemistry. In 1994, he was graduated at Kiev University of Civil Aviation Engineers. He was actively involved in Petroleum industry and worked for Shell, Imperial Oil ESSO, Petro-Canada, Walter Surface Technologies (Bio-Circle Division) as Project manager, Chief Engineer and Territory Manager.

References

External links
Milltown FC Technical Staff bios

1969 births
Living people
Ukrainian expatriate sportspeople in the United States
Ukrainian expatriate sportspeople in Canada
Ukrainian football managers
North York Astros coaches
Place of birth missing (living people)
Ukrainian expatriate football managers
Expatriate soccer managers in the United States
Expatriate soccer managers in Canada